Weezer's Christmas CD (also called Christmas EP or simply Christmas on music streaming platforms) is a two-track promotional EP officially released January 1, 2001. It was sent to radio stations, as well as in small quantities to members of the band's fan club. The songs were recorded at Rivers Cuomo's home studio, dubbed "Mocha Fusion Studios", in October and November of 2000. Additional work was done at Cello Studios.

The cover of the CD features the band members dressed in Santa costumes, photographed by Weezer webmaster and historian Karl Koch in November 2000.

Winter Weezerland
The set was re-released in 2005 by Geffen Records via iTunes in 2005 under the title Winter Weezerland. The cover artwork features the same photograph used on the back of the Christmas CD. As of 2008, the EP is no longer available on iTunes.

Track listing

Personnel
Brian Bell – guitar, vocals
Rivers Cuomo – guitar, vocals
Mikey Welsh – bass, vocals
Patrick Wilson – drums

References

External links
Christmas CD on Weezerpedia

2000 EPs
2000 Christmas albums
Christmas albums by American artists
Weezer EPs
Geffen Records EPs
Alternative rock Christmas albums
Fan-club-release albums